Franz Schuler (born 3 October 1962) is a former Austrian biathlete and police officer, who competed as a member of the Polizeisportverein (police sports club) Innsbruck. He was born in Kufstein.

Selected results 
 1984:
 8th, Winter Olympics 4 × 7.5 kilometres relay (together with Rudolf Horn, Walter Hörl and Alfred Eder)
 30th, Winter Olympics Men's 20 kilometres
 1986:
 2nd, World Championships 10 kilometres
 1988:
 4th, Winter Olympics 4 × 7.5 kilometres relay  (together with Anton Lengauer-Stockner, Bruno Hofstätter and Alfred Eder)
 17th, Winter Olympics Men's 10 kilometres
 36th, Winter Olympics Men's 20 kilometres
 1992:
 12th, Winter Olympics 4 × 7.5 kilometres relay  (together with Bruno Hofstätter, Egon Leitner and Ludwig Gredler)
 21st, Winter Olympics Men's 10 kilometres
 49th, Winter Olympics Men's 20 kilometres
 1994:
 9th, Winter Olympics 4 × 7.5 kilometres relay  (together with Wolfgang Perner, Ludwig Gredler and Martin Pfurtscheller)
 30th, Winter Olympics Men's 10 kilometres
 48th, Winter Olympics Men's 20 kilometres

External links 
 

1962 births
Living people
Olympic biathletes of Austria
Austrian police officers
Austrian male biathletes
Biathletes at the 1984 Winter Olympics
Biathletes at the 1988 Winter Olympics
Biathletes at the 1992 Winter Olympics
Biathletes at the 1994 Winter Olympics
People from Kufstein
Biathlon World Championships medalists
Sportspeople from Tyrol (state)